Forces' Sweetheart is a 1953 British comedy film directed by Maclean Rogers and starring Hy Hazell, Harry Secombe and Michael Bentine.
The plot revolves around two gormless soldiers, played Secombe and Bentine who become infatuated with a female entertainer called Judy (Hazell).

Plot
Recently arrived back home from entertaining British troops in Korea, forces sweetheart Judy James meets with her agent, who has arranged a West End show centred on her and funded by an eccentric English chewing gum magnate Aloysius Dimwitty. Meanwhile, both fantasising that Judy is their fiancée, Flight Lieutenant John Robinson and Private Harry Llewellyn make their way to London to try to meet her. Just before the pair arrive, her actual boyfriend, Lieutenant John Robinson of the Royal Navy, arranges a meeting with her. This allows Llewellyn (who had previously unwittingly decided on the pseudonym Lieutenant John Robinson) and the Flight Lieutenant to be mistaken for their namesake and thus bluff their way into meeting Judy.

Dimwitty leaves abruptly to go back to back to his Scottish castle and - fearing his funding for the show is lost - Llewellyn and the Flight Lieutenant go in pursuit. It emerges that Dimwitty had simply gone north to attend a wedding and he is soon back in London organising a boxing match as a 'first half closer' for the show. Judy's boyfriend proposes to her on the show's opening night, disappointing Llewellyn and the Flight Lieutenant. However, Judy informs the pair that she is one of triplets, the other two of which (both also played by Hazell) appear behind Llewellyn and the Flight Lieutenant.

Cast
 Hy Hazell - Judy James
 Harry Secombe - Harry Llewellyn
 Michael Bentine - John Robinson
 Freddie Frinton - Aloysius Dimwitty
 John Ainsworth - John Robinson
 Molly Weir - Maid
 Adrienne Fancey - Audrey
 Kenneth Henry - Tommy Tupp
 Graham Stark - Simmonds
 John Fitzgerald - Producer
 Michael McCarthy - Plumber

References

External links
 

1953 films
1953 comedy films
Films directed by Maclean Rogers
British comedy films
British black-and-white films
1950s English-language films
1950s British films